This is a list of compositions by the 20th-century Norwegian composer Geirr Tveitt. Since a sizable corpus of his works are lost, and since there are pieces that have been assigned an Opus number, but without names, pieces will be presented here as that.

By Opus number

References
List of compositions by Tveitt by Opus number. at geirrtveitt.com

Tveitt, Geirr